The Palmqvist method, or the Palmqvist toughness test, (after Sven Robert Palmqvist) is a common method to determine the fracture toughness for cemented carbides. In this case, the material's fracture toughness is given by the critical stress intensity factor KIc.

Approach
The Palmqvist-method uses the lengths of the cracks from a number of Vickers indentions to determine the fracture toughness. The Palmqvist fracture toughness is given by

 in units of MPa,

where HV is the Vickers hardness in N/mm2 (or MPa) (i.e., 9.81 x numerical HV), P is the indentation load in N (typically 30 kgf is used) and T is the total crack length (mm) after application of the indenter.

Notes

Materials testing
Fracture mechanics